Abdul Rahman was the Aviation and Tourism minister of Afghanistan until his death on February 14, 2002.

He was murdered in what appeared to be a mob attack on his plane at Kabul International Airport by pilgrims angry that they had been unable to travel to Mecca, Saudi Arabia.
Witnesses and officials said pilgrims beat the minister to death and tossed his body to the tarmac. However, President Hamid Karzai accused six senior government officials of the murder, saying that they were motivated by a long-standing feud.
Three were arrested and the others were being sought in Saudi Arabia. Karzai said five ministers, including the head of the intelligence ministry, General Abdullah Tawhedi; the technical deputy of the Ministry of Defense, General Qalander Big, and a Supreme Court justice, Haji Halim and 15 other suspects have been linked to the assassination.

His widow is Frozan Fana, a medical doctor.
She was a candidate in the 2009 Afghan presidential election.

References

1953 births
2002 deaths
Assassinated Afghan politicians
Aviation ministers of Afghanistan
Tourism ministers of Afghanistan